Erinacea anthyllis, the blue broom, hedgehog plant, or rushy kidney vetch, is a species of flowering plant in the family Fabaceae. It is native to stony mountainous places in the Pyrenees, the Mediterranean and Morocco. It has dense foliage, and lilac coloured pea-like flowers in late spring and early summer.

The Latin specific epithet anthyllis highlights the plant's similarity to the related kidney vetch, Anthyllis vulneraria.

Cultivation
Erinacea anthyllis is cultivated as an ornamental plant. It is best grown in sun, in sharply-drained alkaline soil which reproduces the limestone of its native habitat. Once established, it is extremely long-lived.

Gallery

References

Genisteae
Flora of the Pyrenees
Flora of Morocco
Garden plants of Europe